The Xinjiang Qitai 110m Radio Telescope (QTT) is a planned radio telescope to be built in Qitai County in Xinjiang, China. Upon completion, which is scheduled for 2023, it will be the world's largest fully steerable single-dish radio telescope. It is intended to operate at 300 MHz to 117 GHz. The construction of the antenna project is under the leadership of the Xinjiang Astronomical Observatory of the Chinese Academy of Sciences.

The fully steerable dish of the QTT will allow it to observe 75% of the stars in the sky at any given time. The QTT and the Five-hundred-meter Aperture Spherical Telescope (FAST), also located in China, can both observe frequencies in the "water hole" that has traditionally been favored by scientists engaged in the Search for Extraterrestrial Intelligence (SETI), meaning that each observatory could provide follow-up observations of putative signals from extraterrestrials detected in this quiet part of the radio spectrum at the other observatory.

The radio telescope site selection team considered 48 candidate locations throughout Xinjiang. The chosen site for the facility is in the foothills of the Tian Shan mountains, near Shihezi village, Banjiegou Town, about 46 km (straight-line distance) south-south-east of the Qitai county seat (Qitai Town). The mountain ridges surrounding the site are supposed to provide some protection from electromagnetic noise. The authorities propose designating a radio quiet zone (a 10 km by 15 km rectangle, much smaller than the United States National Radio Quiet Zone) around the future facility.

Goals
The main goals of the QTT include imaging of pulsars, stellar formation, and the large-scale radio structure of the universe.

Similar fully steerable telescopes
Green Bank Telescope, the current largest fully steerable parabolic dish wideband radio telescope, of similar capabilities and 110m x 100m elliptical aperture
Effelsberg 100-m Radio Telescope
The three NASA Deep Space Network stations each sport a fully steerable 70m dish telescope, and the counterpart Soviet Deep Space Network likewise uses the comparable 70m aperture RT-70 line

See also
 List of radio telescopes

References

Chinese telescopes
Radio telescopes
Buildings and structures in Xinjiang
Proposed buildings and structures in China
Proposed telescopes
Changji Hui Autonomous Prefecture